Lyon is an unincorporated community in Franklin County, in the U.S. state of Missouri.

History
A post office called Lyon was established in 1879, and remained in operation until 1903. The community most likely takes its name from Lyon Township.

References

Unincorporated communities in Franklin County, Missouri
Unincorporated communities in Missouri